Albania once possessed a stockpile of weapons of mass destruction. This stockpile of chemical weapons included  of mustard gas, lewisite, adamsite, and phenacyl chloride (chloroacetophenone).

Albania was among the initial countries who signed the Chemical Weapons Convention (CWC) in 1993. The treaty, which came into force in 1997, requires the declaration of chemical stockpiles, and the destruction of all chemical weapons, delivery systems and production facilities. One of only six nations to declare a stockpile, Albania made its declaration in March 2003, after the discovery, in December 2002, of 600 bulk containers of chemicals in an abandoned bunker. The material was probably acquired by Communist leader Enver Hoxha in the mid-1970s from China although no documentation was found, therefore this is entirely speculative.

On 11 July 2007, the Organisation for the Prohibition of Chemical Weapons (OPCW) confirmed the destruction of the entire chemical weapons stockpile in Albania, making Albania the first nation to completely destroy all of its chemical weapons under the terms of the CWC.  Costs were approximately 48 million U.S. dollars. The United States assisted with and funded the destruction operations under the Nunn-Lugar Cooperative Threat Reduction.

Biological and nuclear weapons
Albania acceded to the Biological Weapons Convention on June 3, 1992, banning biological weapons. It also acceded to the Nuclear Non-Proliferation Treaty in September 1990. Albania joined the Geneva Protocol on 20 December 1989, banning chemical and biological weapons and deposited its accession to the Comprehensive Nuclear-Test-Ban Treaty on 23 April 2003.

See also
Cold War

Notes and references

Weapons of mass destruction by country
Soviet chemical weapons program
Military of Albania